Dione is a genus of butterflies of the subfamily Heliconiinae in the family Nymphalidae found from southern United States to South America.

Species
Listed alphabetically:

References

Heliconiini
Nymphalidae of South America
Nymphalidae genera
Taxa named by Jacob Hübner